Damon Connolly is an American attorney and politician serving as a member of the California State Assembly for the 12th district. Elected in November 2022, he assumed office on December 5, 2022.

Early life and education 
Connolly was raised in the San Francisco Bay Area. He earned a Bachelor of Arts degree in economics from University of California, Berkeley and a Juris Doctor from the UC Berkeley School of Law.

Career 
From 1989 to 1993, Connolly worked as an associate attorney at Thelen LLP. He then joined the California Department of Justice, serving as a deputy attorney general from 1993 to 1998 and as an supervising deputy attorney general from 1998 to 2007. In 2007 and 2008, he was a partner at Girard Gibbs LLP. Connolly served as a member of the San Rafael City Council from 2007 to 2014 and the Marin County Board of Supervisors from 2015 to 2022.

Electoral History

References 

Living people
California lawyers
California Democrats
Members of the California State Assembly
University of California, Berkeley alumni
UC Berkeley School of Law alumni
People from Marin County, California
People from San Rafael, California
Year of birth missing (living people)